Nin or NIN may refer to:

 National identification number, a system used by governments around the world to keep track of their citizens 
 National Information Network
 National Institute of Nutrition, Hyderabad, an institution in Hyderabad, India
 Netherlands Institute for Neuroscience, a neuroscience research institute in Amsterdam, the Netherlands
 Nine Inch Nails, an American industrial rock band founded by Trent Reznor
 NIN (magazine), a Serbian political magazine
 NIN (cuneiform), the Sumerian sign for lady
 NIN (gene), a human gene
 Nin (surname), a surname
 Nion or Nin, a letter in the Ogham alphabet
 Akira Nishitani (a.k.a. Nin or Nin-Nin), co-creator of the game Street Fighter II
 Anaïs Nin, French-Cuban author 
 Nin, Croatia, a town in the Zadar County in Croatia
 Bishop Gregory of Nin, an important figure in the 10th century ecclesiastical politics of Dalmatia.

See also 
 Nin (surname)
 National Insurance number